Phaonia apicata is a species of house flies, etc. in the family Muscidae.

Distribution
Canada, United States.

References

Muscidae
Insects described in 1916
Diptera of North America